The 2006 Finnish Figure Skating Championships took place between December 10 and 12, 2005 in Tampere. Skaters competed in the disciplines of men's singles and women's singles on the senior and junior levels. The event was used to help determine the Finnish team to the 2006 European Championships.

Senior results

Men

Ladies

External links
 results

2005 in figure skating
Finnish Figure Skating Championships, 2006
Finnish Figure Skating Championships
2005 in Finnish sport
2006 in Finnish sport